Bigsweir Bridge is an 1827 road bridge crossing the River Wye, straddling the boundary between the parish of St. Briavels, Gloucestershire, England, and Llandogo, Monmouthshire, Wales.

Location
It is the Normal Tidal Limit of the River Wye, and navigation below this point falls under the jurisdiction of the Gloucester Harbour Trustees.

The bridge
The elegant cast-iron road bridge was built in 1827 as part of the new turnpike road constructed up the lower part of the Wye valley between Chepstow and Monmouth. The bridge connects the English and Welsh sides of the river, with an abandoned but recently restored toll house on the Welsh side. A pair of stone flood arches were added at each end some years later, doubling the length of the bridge. Because of its narrow width, modern traffic using the A466 is controlled by traffic signals at either end.

Bigsweir Bridge became a Grade II* listed structure in 1988.  The bridge was repaired, strengthened and repainted in 2010–11.

Locality
There is no village at Bigsweir. According to Sir Joseph Bradney, the weir, one of many of ancient origin on the river, was named after Buddig or Budic, the father of Euddogwy or Oudoceus, a 7th-century Welsh bishop who retired to Llandogo. Recorded early spellings of the name include Bikeswere and Brithekeswere.

Fishing rights at Bigsweir were mentioned in the Domesday Book. The rights over the weir transferred to the Earl of Worcester in 1537, later passing to his successors, the Dukes of Beaufort.

Bigsweir House and estate
The Bigsweir estate, on the Gloucestershire side of the weir, was originally part of the lands of the Bishops of Hereford, before the freehold passed to Thomas Catchmay in 1445.  It remained the main seat and estate of the Catchmay (or Catchmayde) family for several centuries.

Bigsweir House itself was rebuilt around 1740, probably by William Catchmay (d.1743).  It is a building of two storeys built of sandstone, with a symmetrical five-bay front.  Additions were made to the house after it passed to James Rooke (d.1805). The estate was enlarged by purchases of woodland, and the house itself was refurbished with rich internal decoration, including panelled rooms and elaborate cornices and architraves. Further extensions were added in the 20th century. Bigsweir House is a Grade II listed building, added to the register in 1954.

It was filmed in 2018 for the critically acclaimed Netflix series Sex Education.

See also
Bigsweir Woods
List of crossings of the River Wye
List of bridges in Wales

References

Bridges in Monmouthshire
Bridges in Gloucestershire
Cast-iron arch bridges in England
Cast-iron arch bridges in Wales
Grade II* listed bridges in Wales
Grade II* listed buildings in Gloucestershire
Bridges across the River Wye
Former toll bridges in England
Former toll bridges in Wales
Bridges completed in 1827
Grade II* listed buildings in Monmouthshire